Walendów  is a village in the administrative district of Gmina Nadarzyn, within Pruszków County, Masovian Voivodeship, in east-central Poland.

External links
 Jewish Community in Walendów on Virtual Shtetl

References

Villages in Pruszków County